Victor Bedikian is a French guitar maker.

Bedikian worked with Robert Bouchet to learn the style of Antonio Torres, a Spanish guitar maker from the 19th century. Bedikian created his first guitar by 1965 and opened a workshop in Paris in 1977, where Bouchet would often visit. Bedikian is now retired.

References
Guitare Classique article about Victor Bedikian
Making of Classical Guitars (in French)
Makers and Guitars of France (in French)

External links
History of Guitare in France (in French)

Classical guitar makers